Moore-Holt-White House is a historic home located at Burlington, Alamance County, North Carolina. It was built in 1859, and is a vernacular Greek Revival style dwelling consisting of a main two-story front block one room deep with a porch across the front.  It is one of only a few antebellum houses surviving in Burlington.

It was added to the National Register of Historic Places in 1984.

References

Houses on the National Register of Historic Places in North Carolina
Greek Revival houses in North Carolina
Houses completed in 1859
Buildings and structures in Burlington, North Carolina
National Register of Historic Places in Alamance County, North Carolina
Houses in Alamance County, North Carolina